Sacomã is a station on Line 2 (Green) of the São Paulo Metro. From the station, there is access to Sacomã Terminal, a large bus terminal that includes access to Expresso Tiradentes as well as municipal and intercity bus lines.

Station layout

References

São Paulo Metro stations
Railway stations opened in 2010
Railway stations located underground in Brazil